Megatech is a company that designs and manufactures radio controlled entertainment. Its product line includes radio controlled planes, cars, trucks, sailboats, motorboats, submarines, blimps, and others.

History
America's Hobby Center is a hobby shop that was founded in 1931 by the Winston family.  In 1990, Peter Winston created Megatech International.

Products

Avion

A miniature airplane that can be flown both indoors and out. Features a 7.5" wingspan, 8.4g weight, LiPo battery, and completely proportional control.

Media appearances
Megatech products are often mentioned or featured in the media. For example, the Megatech Blimp was mentioned on the Showtime television series Weeds in episode two of the first season.

The H2O Boat was also featured on the June 26, 2003 episode of NBC's The Today Show, where Chris Chianelli drove the boats around in a pool with the show's hosts on a live broadcast.

External links

Radio-controlled car manufacturers
Model manufacturers of the United States
Companies based in Hudson County, New Jersey
Privately held companies based in New Jersey